Custom House is a Canadian foreign exchange and money transfers company based in Victoria, British Columbia. It was acquired by Western Union in 2009 and now forms part of that company's "Western Union Business Solutions" division. In 2022, Western Union sold its business to business foreign exchange division, which became Convera.

History 
The company was founded in 1992 as a small tourist currency exchange kiosk titled "Custom House Currency Exchange" in Victoria's old waterfront customs house.  In 1993, the company opened its first corporate foreign exchange office.

After expanding in Canada, it began its US operations in 1997 and an Australian operation in 2000. The company was later renamed "Custom House Global Foreign Exchange", then renamed again to "Custom House". It provided small businesses and individuals with services that included wire transfers, foreign currency drafts, and forward exchange contracts.

In 2009, Western Union bought the company for $370 million USD. In 2015, Custom House's founder, Peter Gustavson, incorporated a new foreign exchange and global payment company which its assets were acquired by Global Reach Group in 2020 and subsequently Fleetcor in 2022.

References 

Western Union
Financial services companies of Canada
Financial services companies established in 1992
2009 mergers and acquisitions
Foreign exchange companies

Financial services companies based in British Columbia